The technical term direction of fit is used to describe the distinctions that are offered by two related pairs of opposing terms:
 The more general set of mind-to-world (i.e., mind-to-fit-world, not from-mind-to-world) vs. world-to-mind (i.e., world-to-fit-mind) used by philosophers of mind, and
 The narrower, more specific set, word-to-world (i.e., word-to-fit-world) vs. world-to-word  (i.e., world-to-fit-word) used by advocates of speech act theory such as John Searle.

In general

In philosophy of mind, a belief  has a mind-to-world direction of fit. A belief (that p, say) depicts the world as being in a state of affairs such that p is true. Beliefs, some philosophers have argued, aim at the truth and so aim to fit the world. A belief is satisfied when it fits the world.

A desire, on the other hand, normally expresses a yet to be realized state of affairs and so has a world-to-mind direction of fit. A desire that p, unlike a belief, doesn't depict the world as being in the state that p; rather it expresses a desire that the world be such that p is true. Desire is a state that is satisfied when the world fits it.

A way to account for the difference is that a (rational) person that holds the belief that p when confronted with evidence that not-p, will revise his belief, whereas a person that desires that p can retain his desire that p in the face of evidence that not-p.

To a philosopher of language a word-to-world fit occurs when, say, a sports journalist correctly names Jones as a goal scorer; while if the journalist mistakenly names Smith as the goal scorer, the printed account does not display a word-to-world fit, and must be altered such that it matches the real world. Conversely, a world-to-word fit occurs when a fan of Smith's team opines that they deserved to win the match, even though they lost. In this case, the world would have to change to make the sports fan's wish become true.

However, in the case of, say, a judge delivering a death sentence to a criminal declared guilty by a jury, the utterances of the judge alter the world, through the fact of that utterance; and, in this case, the judge is generating a world-to-word-to-world fit (see below). So, if the judge's opinion is upheld, the world must be altered to match the content of the judge's utterance (i.e., the criminal must be executed).

In medieval philosophy
According to Thomas Aquinas (Summa Theologica, Part I, Question 21, Article 2), there are two kinds of "truth" (veritas), both understood as correspondence between mind (intellectus) or words (oratio) and world ("things", res):

In speech act theory
Perhaps the first to speak of a "direction of fit" was the philosopher J. L. Austin. Austin did not use the distinction between different directions of fit to contrast commands or expressions of intention to assertions, or desires to beliefs. He rather distinguishes different ways of asserting that an item is of a certain type.

In an extensive discussion of the issues involved with the differences between, say, (a) wrongly calling a triangle a square (something which, he said, was committing an act of violence to the language) and (b) wrongly describing a triangular object as being a square (something which, he said, was committing an act of violence to the facts), Austin distinguished between what he termed:
 "the onus of match": in the case of one wanting to match X and Y, the distinction between the matching of X to Y and the matching of Y to X; and
 "the direction of fit": in the case of naming something, the difference between the fitting of a name to an item, and the fitting of an item to a name.

The concept of direction of fit can also apply to speech acts: e.g., statements, guesses and conjectures have word-to-world direction of fit, while commands and promises have a world-to-word direction of fit.

John Searle and Daniel Vanderveken assert that there are only four possible "directions of fit" in language:
1. The word-to-world direction of fit.
In achieving success of fit the propositional content of the utterance fits an independently existing state of affairs in the world. E.g.: "We are married".

2. The world-to-word direction of fit.
To achieve success of fit the world must change to match the propositional content of the utterance. E.g.: "Will you marry me?", "I want to marry him", "You'd just better marry her, buddy!", etc.

3. The double direction of fit.
To achieve success of fit the world is thereby altered to fit the propositional content by representing the world as being so altered, unlike sense 2. E.g.: "I declare you man and wife". The 'doubled' direction is therefore always world-to-word-to-world. For obvious reasons, Searle calls sentences of this type 'declarations'.

4. The null or empty direction of fit.
There is no direct question of achieving success of fit between the propositional content and the world, because success of fit is presupposed by the utterance. E.g.: "I'm glad I married you" presupposes that the speaker is married to the listener.

Searle used this notion of "direction of fit" to create a taxonomy of illocutionary acts.
  
Although Elizabeth Anscombe never employed the term "the direction of fit", Searle has strongly argued that the following passage from her work Intention was, by far, "the best illustration" of the distinction between the tasks of "[getting] the words (more strictly their propositional content) to match the world… [and that of getting] the world to match the words":

In philosophy of mind

According to Velleman, when used in the domain of the philosophy of mind, the concept direction of fit represents the distinguishing feature between two types of intentional mental states:

Facta (singular factum, states that currently exist) are states with a mind-to-world direction of fit.
 Examples include beliefs, perceptions, hypotheses, and fantasies.  In the event of a mismatch between the mental state and the world, the mental state is in some sense false or wrong and should perhaps be changed.

Facienda (singular faciendum, states that are yet to exist) are states with a world-to-mind direction of fit.
Examples include intentions and desires.  If there is a mismatch between the mental state and the world, the world is in some sense wrong and should perhaps be changed.

In some forms of mind-body dualism, a matching factum and faciendum must be present in a person's mind in order for him to act intentionally.  If a person has the belief that action (A) will lead to state (S), and has the desire that state (S) obtain, then he will perform action (A). The action is directly caused by simultaneous presence of the two mental states; no further explanation is needed.

According to Velleman:
The term "direction of fit" refers to the two ways in which attitudes can relate propositions to the world.
In cognitive attitudes [such as belief], a proposition is grasped as patterned after the world; whereas in conative attitudes [such as desire], the proposition is grasped as a pattern for the world to follow.
The propositional object of desire is regarded not as fact -- not, that is, as factum, having been brought about -- but rather as faciendum, to be brought about: it's regarded not as true but as to be made true.

See also

 Triangle of reference

References

Bibliography

 Anscombe, G.E.M., Intention (Second Edition), Basil Blackwell, (Oxford), 1963 (first edition 1957).
 Austin, J.L., How to Do Things With Words: The William James Lectures Delivered at Harvard University in 1955, Oxford University Press, (Oxford), 1962.
 Austin, J.L., "How to Talk: Some Simple Ways", Proceedings of the Aristotelian Society, Vol.53, (1953), pp. 227–246.
 Churchland, Paul, "Conceptual progress and word/world relations: In search of the essence of natural kinds", Canadian Journal of Philosophy 15(1):1–17 (1985)
 Humberstone, I.L., "Direction of Fit", Mind, Vol.101, No.401, (January 1992), pp. 59–83.
 Kissine, Mikhail. "Direction of fit". Logique et Analyse 50.198 (2007): 113-128.
 Searle, J.R., "A Taxonomy of Illocutionary Acts", pp. 1–19 in Searle, J.R., Expression and Meaning: Studies in the Theory of Speech Acts, Cambridge University Press, (Cambridge), 1979. (N.B. This is a reprint of the same paper that was published twice, in 1975 and 1976, under two different titles: (a) Searle, J.R., "A Taxonomy of Illocutionary Acts", pp. 344–369 in Gunderson, K. (ed.), Language, Mind, and Knowledge, University of Minnesota Press, (Minneapolis), 1975; and (b) Searle, J.R., "A Classification of Illocutionary Acts", Language in Society, Vol.5, (1976), pp. 1–24.)
 Searle, J.R., Expression and Meaning: Studies in the Theory of Speech Acts, Cambridge University Press, (Cambridge), 1985.
 Searle, J.R., Rationality in Action, The MIT Press, (Cambridge, Massachusetts), 2001.
 Searle, J.R. & Vanderveken, D., Foundations of Illocutionary Logic, Cambridge University Press, (Cambridge), 1985.
 Velleman, J.D., "The Guise of the Good", Noûs, Vol.26, No.1, (March 1992), pp. 3–26.

Philosophy of language
Philosophy of mind